August W. "Augie" Hoffmann III (February 23, 1981) is a former American football guard and the current offensive line coach at Rutgers. Hoffmann attended Saint Joseph Regional High School in neighboring Montvale, New Jersey. He then went to Boston College, where he played football all four years.

NFL playing career

After graduating from Boston College, Hoffmann went undrafted, but was signed as an undrafted free agent by the New Orleans Saints and was a member of their practice squad in 2004 and 2005. He was signed by the New Orleans Saints to a Reserve/Future contract on January 3, 2006.

Coaching career

Saint Joseph Regional High School
In July 2009 it was announced that he would return to St. Joe's, as an English teacher and head freshman football coach and assistant to the varsity.

On December 16, 2013, it was announced that he would take over as head coach of the St. Joe's Green Knights Varsity Football team.

Rutgers
On January 7, 2020 it was announced that Augie would join the Rutgers Scarlet Knights as the team's running backs coach and help lead the team to its former glory. In 2022 he switched positions and became the team’s offensive line coach. It was announced he would not remain with the coaching staff for the 2023 season.

References

External links
NFL player profile for Augie Hoffman
Rutgers football Augie Hoffman coaching profile

1981 births
Living people
American football offensive guards
Boston College Eagles football players
High school football coaches in New Jersey
New Orleans Saints players
People from Park Ridge, New Jersey
Players of American football from New Jersey
Rutgers Scarlet Knights football coaches
Saint Joseph Regional High School alumni
Sportspeople from Bergen County, New Jersey